Below is a list of Wyandotte County parks and parkways. This includes the various open spaces and senenic areas, such as  parks and parkways, in Wyandotte County, Kansas, United States, which includes the cities of Kansas City, Bonner Springs, and Edwardsville.

Parks and open spaces

A to M
Alvey Park
Bethany Park
Big Eleven Park
Bill Clem Park
City Park:
Clifton Park
Clopper Field
Coronado Park 
Delaware Park
Edwardsville Community Park
Edgerton Park
Eighth St. Park 
Eisenhower Park
Emerson Park
Fisher Park 
Fun Valley North Park
Heathwood Park
Highland Park
Huron Park (Huron Cemetery)
Jersey Creek Park
Kaw Point Riverfront Park:
Kensington Park
Kerry Roberts Park
Klamm Park
Lion's Park
Mac's Park
Matney Park
Mount Marty Park

N to Z
Northrup Park
Parkwood Park
Pierson County Park
Quindaro Park 
Rosedale Park
Riverview Park
Roswell Park (Fairfax Park) 
Ruby Park 
Shawnee Park
St. Margeret's Park
St. John's Park
Stoney Point Park
Thompson Park
Turner Stadium Park
Vega Field
Vera Garland Park
Waterway Park
Welborn Park
Westhieght Park
Wyandotte County Park:
Wyandotte County Lake Park and (Wyandotte County Lake):
Wyndotte County Sports Association Park

External links
Parks and Recreation - Parks, wycokck.org.

Parks in Kansas
Protected areas of Wyandotte County, Kansas